Paul Masson (1859 – October 22, 1940) was an early pioneer of California viticulture known for his brand of Californian sparkling wine.

Biography
Masson emigrated from the Burgundy region of France in 1878 (at the age of 19) to California, United States, where he met Charles Lefranc (owner of the Almaden Vineyard and Wine Company), one of a number of French immigrants who had expanded the viticulture introduced into the Santa Clara Valley by the Catholic mission fathers. Masson returned to France in 1880 to finish school at The Sorbonne. After college, he returned to San Jose, California due to the depression in the French wine industry caused by the Phylloxera plague and became the winemaker at Almaden. After the death of Lefranc, Masson purchased 573 acres in Saratoga, California, which he named La Cresta. He set about to plant 60 acres, mainly Pinot Noir and Chardonnay with cuttings from Burgundy and re-named the new winery the Paul Masson Champagne Company, now known as The Mountain Winery. According to the Paul Masson company web site, in 1892 Masson's first sparkling wine under the name "champagne" was introduced at Almaden, and Masson eventually became known as the "Champagne King of California" after winning at the Paris Expo in 1900.

He was appointed to California's Board of State Viticultural Commissioners on August 30, 1913.

Masson died at his home in San Jose on October 22, 1940, and is buried at Oak Hill Memorial Park.

Winery

Masson shifted part of his production to the Santa Cruz Mountains above Saratoga, California and built his "chateau" on a knob overlooking the Santa Clara Valley in 1905. Now known as "The Mountain Winery", the Paul Masson Mountain Winery is on the National Park Service's National Register of Historic Places, though it ceased making wines in 1952. Instead, it serves as a conferencing and events venue - various events are held at the winery, such as concert series, weddings, and other special events. A chess tournament was held there annually in the late 1970s and early 1980s. Around 2000, the then-current owners of the site hired winemaker Jeffrey Patterson to restart winemaking on site. The vineyards were reestablished at the Mountain Winery in 2004.

Advertising

The Paul Masson brand is best remembered for its 1978–1981 marketing association with actor-director Orson Welles, who promised for Masson: "We will sell no wine before its time." A widely circulated and much-parodied outtake for one commercial from the campaign features Welles attempting to deliver his lines while severely inebriated. Welles was eventually fired as a spokesman for the brand in 1981, after answering a question about Paul Masson on a TV chat show, saying that he was now on a diet and so no longer drank wine; he was (briefly) replaced as spokesman by John Gielgud.

Despite the ads' success at the time, the Paul Masson brand has suffered from a long-term image problem, particularly since its founder's death in 1940, in being synonymous with low-end wines. As The New York Times observed in 1990: "While many consumers know them - who can forget Orson Welles's breathy incantation of 'We will sell no wine before its time' for Masson - they lack cachet."

Paul Masson and NASA
In the 1970s, NASA bought Masson Rare Cream Sherry for a Skylab mission and packaged some for testing on a "zero-G" aircraft. Unfortunately, the smell quickly permeated the cabin making astronauts physically sick, and public pressure over taking alcohol into space led NASA to abandon their plans.

Ownership of Paul Masson wines

Martin Ray (1936–42)
After the death of his wife, Louise Lefranc, in 1936, Masson placed the winery on the market. Mentored by Paul Masson, California wine pioneer Martin Ray purchased the winery and vineyards.

However, two years after Masson's own death in 1940, Ray sold the winery, using the proceeds to buy land on the hilltop across from the old Paul Masson vineyards in Saratoga, where he used Burgundian cuttings of Pinot noir and Chardonnay from the Masson estate to craft a single varietal, region-specific wine from 1943 through 1972, in what is now known as Mount Eden Vineyards.

Seagram Company (1942–87)
Six years after buying the Paul Masson winery and brand, Martin Ray sold them to the Canadian-based Seagram Company, Ltd, the global wine and spirits conglomerate, which (along with minority share owners) owned the brand for the next 45 years, although as early as 1952 they closed Masson's Saratoga winery as a working wine estate.

It was Seagram who, worried by the brand's sagging sales in the 1970s, brought in first Orson Welles (1978–81) and then John Gielgud (1982–85) as advertising spokespersons for the wines. In the 1980s, Seagram also acquired the Taylor California Cellars brand (and production facilities) from Coca-Cola, based on the premise promoted by Seagram's strategic planning head, Mary Cunningham, that the only way to succeed in the wine business was to approach Gallo's massive sales volume. Over the next twenty years, the American wine industry would dramatically segment itself with, essentially, all the large volume brands falling by the wayside. Internal competition and resulting cannibalization dramatically reduced the combined sales of Paul Masson and Taylor (as it did with Almaden and Inglenook, also owned by a single parent company).

Vintners International (1987–93)
The above changes resulted in the Paul Masson brand being sold to Vintners International in 1987, although Vintners went bankrupt six years later.

Centera (1993–2021); renamed Constellation Brands from 2000
Vintners was in turn purchased by the Centera Wine Company (formerly "Canandaigua") of New York in 1993, as part of Vintner's bankruptcy proceedings.  Canandaigua was then renamed Constellation Brands in 2000. Constellation Brands produced two main lines with the label: Paul Masson brandies, and Paul Masson wines.

In 2008, the Paul Masson wine line was sold by Constellation Brands, along with the Paul Masson winery, to the Wine Group. However, Constellation continued to produce Paul Masson brandies until 2021.

In 2019, Constellation Brands announced that it was engaging in a major restructuring which involved focussing on “power brands”, which it defined as commanding a retail price of over $11 a bottle. This meant discontinuing or selling off 40% of their production, including the low-cost Paul Masson brandies produced in New York. Although a buyer was found, the Federal Trade Commission did not approve the sale until 2021.

Divestment of the wines and winery to Wine Group LLC (2008–18)
In a $134 million deal in 2008, Wine Group LLC of San Francisco purchased the Paul Masson winery, which had ceased making wine in 1952, and now serves as a conferencing and events center. Wine Group LLC subsequently removed the Paul Masson name and renamed it "The Mountain Winery".

As part of the deal, Wine Group LLC also purchased two California wine brands from Constellation Brands, including the Paul Masson table wine range, consisting of three types of bottle sold - white, red, and rosé, made from grapes grown elsewhere in California. The wines were sold in the company's distinctive jam-jar top "carafe" bottles. Around 2018, the company quietly discontinued the sale of Paul Masson wines.

Sale of the brandies to E. & J. Gallo (2021–present)
In 2019, E & J Gallo Winery of Modesto, California began negotiations for the acquisition of the Paul Masson brandies from Constellation Brands. In 2021, it was announced that the Federal Trade Commission had approved the sale, allowing production of the brandies to return to California after 28 years of being made in New York. No one presently makes any Paul Masson wines, as the rights remain with the Wine Group LLC, which discontinued production in 2018.

References

1859 births
1940 deaths
American viticulturists
Businesspeople from the San Francisco Bay Area
French viticulturists